Hales is a village in Staffordshire approximately 2 miles east of Market Drayton. Population details as taken at the 2011 census can be found under Loggerheads. There is an Anglican church dedicated to Saint Mary.

See also
Listed buildings in Loggerheads, Staffordshire

References 

Villages in Staffordshire